Oregon has at least 19 features named Thomas Creek:

See also 
 List of rivers of Oregon

References 

Rivers of Oregon